Victor Fung Kwok-king  (sometimes Victor K. Fung; born 1945, Hong Kong) is the Group Chairman of Li & Fung group of companies. Together with his brother William, he owns a controlling stake of 32% in the business, which was founded by his grandfather.

He has held a number of public and other offices, including chairman of the Airport Authority Hong Kong, Hong Kong University Council and the Greater Pearl River Delta Business Council.

Education
Fung has Bachelor of Science and Master of Science degrees in electrical engineering from MIT. After earning a PhD in business economics from Harvard Business School, he stayed there as a professor of finance. For his early education, he enrolled in King George V School in Hong Kong.

Career
At present, Victor Fung is the Group Chairman of Li & Fung Group, and his brother William is the Group managing director. The business was founded by their grandfather, Fung Pak-liu, in 1906 and subsequently led by their father, Fung Hon-chu.

Fung is chairman of the Hong Kong-Japan Business Co-operation Committee and co-chair of France-based The Evian Group at IMD forum and think tank. He has been chairman since 2008 of the International Chamber of Commerce. He was formerly chairman of the Hong Kong Trade Development Council (1991–2000) and chairman of Airport Authority.

In 2008, Fung was appointed by Donald Tsang, the Chief Executive of Hong Kong, to be the member of "Task Force on Economic Challenges" to evaluate the situation and identify new opportunities during the financial tsunami. The company laid off employees to cut costs, for which he was publicly criticised.

Other positions in civil and public service:
 
 Commission on Strategic Development of the HKSAR Government
 Informal Business Advisory Body to the World Trade Organization
 Hong Kong Representative on the APEC Business Advisory Council (1996), (2001)
 Hong Kong Government Judicial Officers Recommendation Committee (?-2006)

 Member of IESE's International Advisory Board (IAB).

Honours
 Hong Kong's Businessman of the Year 1995
 Top 25 Managers in BusinessWeek magazine 1995
 Awarded Gold Bauhinia Star (GBS) in 2003 for distinguished service to the Hong Kong community.
 Businessman of the Year 2005 Forbes Asia magazine
 One of "60 Years of Asian Heroes" (Time Asia magazine)

Personal
Fung is married with three children and like his brother William holds American citizenship.

See also
 William Fung
 Antony Leung
 Politics of Hong Kong
 Executive Council of Hong Kong

References

External links
 Victor Fung
 Victor Fung
 ICC elects new Vice-Chairman

1945 births
Living people
Hong Kong chief executives
Members of the National Committee of the Chinese People's Political Consultative Conference
Harvard Business School alumni
Harvard Business School faculty
MIT School of Engineering alumni
Hong Kong billionaires
Li & Fung
Members of Committee of 100
Progressive Hong Kong Society politicians
Date of birth missing (living people)
Alumni of King George V School, Hong Kong
Commanders of the Order of the British Empire